Abner Abreu Castro (born October 24, 1989) is a former professional baseball player. He played in the Minor League System for the Cleveland Guardians, Chicago Cubs, and Atlanta Braves. He later played for the Saitama Seibu Lions and Yomiuri Giants of Nippon Professional Baseball. Abreu currently works as a scout with the San Francisco Giants.

References

External links

1989 births
Lake County Captains players
Dominican Republic expatriate baseball players in Japan
Dominican Republic expatriate baseball players in the United States
Kinston Indians players
Kōchi Fighting Dogs players
Living people
Daytona Cubs players
Rome Braves players
Saitama Seibu Lions players
Yomiuri Giants players